Metropolitan Preparatory Academy (or Metro Prep) is a private, semestered, coeducational, middle school (grades 7–8) and high school (grades 9–12) for university-oriented students. It is located in midtown, Toronto.

Metro Prep was founded in 1982 and operates without school uniforms.

In addition to regular classrooms, Metro Prep's facilities include a science laboratory, two computer labs, an art room, cafeteria, study hall and gymnasium. Metro Prep also offers a fully operational weight and fitness room.

Metro Prep has twenty full-time faculty members. The average high school class size is approximately 12 students.

Athletics

Metro Prep offers year-round athletic programs, and is a member of the Small Schools Athletic Federation (SSAF) and a charter member of the Toronto District College Athletic Association (TDCAA). Metro Prep sports teams compete with schools throughout the region.

Current sports teams include basketball, softball, volleyball, hockey, skiing, snowboarding, cross-country, golf, tennis, soccer, rugby, ultimate, and track and field.

Extracurricular activities

Metro Prep offers a wide range of extracurricular activities, including mountain biking, caving and white-water rafting, theatre trips, dog sledding expeditions, science camps, clubs (including robotics and chess), theatrical production, trips to Ottawa, Quebec City, New York City, and Washington D.C., and much more.

Notable grads

 John Brunswick (2003)
 Kate Ruby-Sachs (2003)
 Eden Grinshpan (2004)
 Roxy Kirshenbaum (2005)
 Brad Silverberg (2008)
 Brian Vadasz (2008)

References

Toronto Life: Schools Guide
Small Schools Athletic Federation Directory
Our Kids Publications Ltd.

External links

Educational institutions established in 1982
High schools in Toronto
Middle schools in Toronto
Private schools in Toronto
1982 establishments in Ontario